Hati (also Romanized as Hatī; also known as  Tang-e Ḩatī) is a village in Hati Rural District, Hati District, Lali County, Khuzestan Province, Iran. At the 2006 census, its population was 186, in 33 families.

References 

Populated places in Lali County